The constituency of the Lozère (French: Circonscription de la Lozère) is a French legislative constituency in the Lozère département. Like the other 576 French constituencies, it elects one MP using the two-round system, with a run-off if no candidate receives over 50% of the vote in the first round.

Description

The constituency of Lozère is the only constituency within Lozère, making it one of only two such departments in metropolitan France with a single constituency (along with Creuse). The second constituency was abolished as a result of the 2010 redistricting of French legislative constituencies. Despite this adjustment the electorate in the seat remains low when compared to other constituencies.
The last deputy of the second constituency, Pierre Morel-À-L'Huissier, was elected the deputy for the entire department constituency.

See also
 Lozère's 1st constituency

Deputies

Election results

2022

 
 
 
 
 
 
 
 
 
|-
| colspan="8" bgcolor="#E9E9E9"|
|-
 
 

 
 
 
 
 

* LREM dissident

2017

 
 
 
 
 
 
 
|-
| colspan="8" bgcolor="#E9E9E9"|
|-

2012

 
 
 
 
 
 
 
|-
| colspan="8" bgcolor="#E9E9E9"|
|-

References

1